Andria Apakidze (September 3, 1914 – November 25, 2005), Doctor of History and professor, was a Georgian archaeologist and historian specializing in the studies of ancient Georgia, and the author of widely known works on archaeology.

He led the large-scale excavations of Armazi, Tsitsamuri, and Sarkine (1936), Pitsunda (1952-1974) and Mtskheta (since 1975). He directed the Janashia Museum of Georgia from 1943 until 1952 when he became the head of the archaeology section of the Georgian Academy of Sciences Institute of History. Since April 1, 1994, he presided over the Mtskheta Archaeology Institute.

References 

1914 births
2005 deaths
Archaeologists from Georgia (country)
20th-century historians from Georgia (country)
Soviet historians
Soviet archaeologists
Honoured Scientists of Georgia (country)